Tricarbon monoxide C3O is a reactive radical oxocarbon molecule found in space, and which can be made as a transient substance in the laboratory. It can be trapped in an inert gas matrix or made as a short lived gas. C3O can be classified as a ketene or an oxocumulene a kind of heterocumulene.

Natural occurrence
C3O has been detected by its microwave spectrum in the dark cold Taurus Molecular Cloud One and also in the protostar Elias 18.

The route to produce this is speculated to be:
HC + CO2 → HC3O+ + CO
HC3O+ → C3O + H+
or
C2 + CO → C3O which is more favourable at lower temperatures.

The related C3S is more abundant in dark molecular clouds, even though oxygen is 20 times more common than sulfur.  The difference is due to the higher rate of formation and that C3S is less polar.

Production
C3O can be produced by heating Meldrum's acid. This also produces acetone, carbon monoxide and carbon dioxide.

R. L. DeKock and W. Waltner were the first to identify C3O by reacting atomic carbon with carbon monoxide in an argon matrix. They observed an infrared absorption line at 2241 cm−1. They produced carbon atoms by heating graphite inside a thin tantalum tube.

M. E. Jacox photolysed C3O2 in an argon matrix to produce C3O with an IR absorption line at 2244 cm−1, however he did not recognise what was produced.

By heating diazocyclopentanetrione or a similar acid anhydride, (2,4-azo-3-oxo-dipentanoic anhydride), C3O is produced.  Also the action of light on tetracarbon dioxide yields C3O and CO.

Heating fumaryl chloride also yields C3O. Heating Lead 2,4-dinitroresorcinate also produces C3O along with C2O, CO and carbon suboxide. An electric discharge in carbon suboxide produces about 11 ppm C3O.

Roger Brown heated 3,5-dimethyl-1-propynolpyrazole to over 700 °C to make C3O.
Also pyrolysis of 5,5'-bis(2,2-dimethyl-4,6-dioxo-1,3-dioxanylidene or di-isopropylidene ethylenetetracarboxylate yields C3O.

Irradiating carbon monoxide ice with electrons yields a mixture of carbon oxides, including C3O. This process could happen on icy bodies in space.

Reactions

C3O can be stabilised as a ligand in the pentacarbonyls of group 6 elements as in Cr(CO)5CCCO. This is formed from [n-Bu4N][CrI(CO)5] and the silver acetylide derivative of sodium propiolate (AgC≡CCOONa), and then thiophosgene. AgC≡CCOONa in turn is made from silver ions and sodium propiolate. The blue black solid complex is called pentacarbony1(3-oxopropadienylidene)chromium(0).  It is quite volatile and decomposes at 32 °C. Its infrared spectrum shows a band at 2028 cm−1 due to CCCO. The complex can dissolve in hexane, however it slowly decomposes, losing dicarbon (C2) which goes on to form acetylenes and cumulenes in the solvent. Dimethyl sulfoxide oxidises the CCCO ligand to carbon suboxide./

C3O deposits a reddish-black film on glass.

The reaction of C3O  and urea is predicted to form uracil. The pathway for this, is that firstly the two molecules react to form isocyanuric acid and propiolamide, the NH then reacts to bond with the triple bond, with the NH2 group moving back.  Then a final cyclisation occurs to make uracil.

Properties
The C3O molecules do not last long.  At the low pressure of 1 pascal, they survive about one second.
The force constants for the bonds are:C1-O 14.94, C1-C2 1.39 C2-C3 6.02 mdyn/Å. The bond lengths are C-O 1.149, C1-C2 1.300, C2-C3 1.273 Å. The molecule is linear.

Proton affinity is 885 kJmol−1. The dipole moment is 2.391 D. The oxygen end has a positive charge, and the carbon end the negative charge. The molecule behaves as if there are triple bonds at each end, and a single bond in the middle. This is isoelectronic to cyanogen.

Molecular constants used in determining the microwave spectrum are rotational constant B0=4810.8862 MHz centrifugal distortion constant D0=0.00077 MHz. Known microwave spectral lines vary from 9621.76 for J=1←0 to 182792.35 MHz for J=19←18.

References

Oxocarbons
Heterocumulenes
Enones